Hartmann the Anarchist or The Doom of the Great City is a science fiction novel by Edward Douglas Fawcett first published in 1893. It remained out of print for over 100 years and has only recently been re-published.

The plot centers around Mr Stanley, a young moneyed gentleman who aims to stand for election as part of the Labour party in the early 20th century. Through his associations with many of London's most prominent socialists and anarchists, he encounters and befriends Rudolph Hartmann and 'goes along' with Hartmann's plan to attack London using his airship The Attila. Much of London is destroyed by fire and shells in the beginning of their plans to replace civilization with anarchism:

"But how is the new order to take shape? How educe system from chaos?"

"We want no more 'systems,' or 'constitutions' -- we shall have anarchy. Men will effect by voluntary association, and abjure the foulness of the modern wage-slavery and city-mechanisms."

"But can you expect the more brutal classes to thrive under this system. Will they not rather degenerate into savagery?"

"You forget the Attila will still sail the breeze, and she will then have her fleet of consorts."

"What! You do not propose, then, to leave anarchy unreasoned?"

"Not at once -- the transition would be far too severe. Some supervision must necessarily be exercised, but, as a rule, it will never be more than nominal."

See also

Die Anarchisten, an 1891 novel by John Henry Mackay also set in the fin de siècle London anarchist milieu
The Aerial Anarchists

References

External links 
 Hartmann the Anarchist at the Internet Archive
 
 Tangent Books Website
 A 2007 appreciation of the novel

1892 British novels
1892 science fiction novels
Anarchist fiction
British science fiction novels